"Nice to Meet Ya" is a song by Irish singer Niall Horan, released through Capitol Records as the lead single from his second studio album Heartbreak Weather on 4 October 2019. Horan co-wrote the track with Ruth-Anne Cunningham in one day.

Background
In June 2019, Horan told fans that they would hear new music from him by the end of the year. In early September, he posted online that he was "listening to songs from my new record and I'm so excited to get going". Co-writer Ruth-Anne Cunningham, whom Horan worked with on the song "Slow Hands", said the track gives her "2000s rock, Kasabian/Arctic Monkeys vibes".

Composition
According to the sheet music published at musicnotes.com, the song is written in the key of E major.

Promotion
Horan formally announced the track on social media on 26 September 2019, posting its cover art and writing "After nearly 2 years since Flicker I'm ready to go." Horan initially tweeted the link to his website the day before, which crashed soon after. From the snippet posted to Instagram, Mike Wass of Idolator stated that the track "sounds like a stomping, upbeat anthem".

Live performances
On 3 November 2019, Horan performed the song for the first time at the 2019 MTV Europe Music Awards. On December 15, 2019 Horan performed the song on Saturday Night Live. On March 9, 2020 Horan performed the song on The Late Late Show with James Corden.

Critical reception
Brittany Spanos of Rolling Stone described the song as "alluring" while complimenting the "urgent piano riff that builds up to include hand-claps, a sturdy bass line and the rest of his dynamic full band".

Track listing

Charts

Weekly charts

Year-end charts

Certifications

Release history

References

2019 singles
2019 songs
Capitol Records singles
Niall Horan songs
Songs written by Niall Horan
Songs written by RuthAnne
Songs written by Tobias Jesso Jr.
Songs written by Julian Bunetta